The 1948 Coupe de France Final was a football match held at Stade Olympique Yves-du-Manoir, Colombes on May 10, 1948, that saw Lille OSC defeat RC Lens 3–2 thanks to goals by Roger Vandooren and Jean Baratte (2).

Match details

See also
Coupe de France 1947–1948

External links
Coupe de France results at Rec.Sport.Soccer Statistics Foundation
Report on French federation site

Coupe
1948
Coupe De France Final 1948
Coupe De France Final 1948
Sport in Hauts-de-Seine
Coupe de France Final
Coupe de France Final